Patrick J. Sullivan (born July 20, 1962) is an American politician who served as a member of the Washington House of Representatives, representing the 47th district from 2005-2022. A member of the Democratic Party, he served as the House Majority Leader from 2010-2022 and served on the Ways and Means Committee.

Early life and career
Sullivan earned a BA from the University of Washington.

Sullivan served as the first mayor of Covington. He also worked as a legislative assistant in Olympia and the King County Council.

References

1962 births
21st-century American politicians
Living people
Democratic Party members of the Washington House of Representatives
People from King County, Washington
Politicians from Duluth, Minnesota